Shankar Madhav Chitnavis  (born 1867  - ) was a statutory officer and worked a deputy commissioner of Central Province. He was brother of Gangadhar Rao Chitnavis.

He was member of First and Second Legislative Council of Central Provinces and Berar during 1921-23 and 1923-1926.

He was elected President of Third and Fourth Legislative Council of Central Provinces and Berar during 1927-30 and 1930-1937.

He was awarded the Kaisar-i-Hind Gold Medal 9 November 1901. and appointed ISO in the 1914 Birthday Honours.

References

Politicians from Nagpur
1867 births
Indian Companions of the Imperial Service Order
Recipients of the Kaisar-i-Hind Medal
Year of death missing
19th-century Indian politicians